Flying Monster may refer to:
Flying Monsters 3D, a 2010 documentary by David Attenborough
Flying Spaghetti Monster, the deity of a religion and a social movement
Rodan! the Flying Monster, 1956 Japanese film